The Anti-Booker prize was a Russian literary award that existed between 1995 and 2001. Established by newspaper Nezavisimaya Gazeta using money of Boris Berezovsky. Its name refers to British-sponsored Russian Booker and differences are:
 prize was to be one dollar more than the Russian Booker
 not limited to novels, but has 5 nominations (also poetry, stageplays, literary critics and memoirs)
 current year's works were awarded.

Judging panel
Judges included well-known journalists, editors, literary critics and artists:
 Andrei Vasilevsky, editor-in-chief of Novy Mir;
 Natalya Ivanova, assistant of editor-in-chief of Znamya;
 Andrei Volos, writer awarded at Anti-booker 98;
 Victor Toporov, literary critics and translator;
 Yevgeniy Rein, poet;
 Natalya Trauberg, translator;
 Alexander Guelman, author of many Soviet stageplays;
 Irina Kupchenko, People's Artist of the USSR;
 Oleg Tabakov, People's Artist of the USSR
et al.

Winners
 1995 – Aleksei Varlamov, Nativity (Рождение) (novel)
 1996 – Dmitri Bakin (pseudónim), Country of origin (Страна происхождения) (novel)
         – Sergei Gandlevski, Holiday (Праздник) (poetry)
         – Ivan Saveliev, Voyage at the edge (Путешествие на краю) (piece)
 1997 – Dmitri Galkovsky, Infinite Dead-end (Бесконечный тупик) (novel) – Dmitri Galkovski declined the prize
         – Timur Kibirov, Paráfrasis (Парафразис) (poetry)
         – Oleg Bogayev, Russian popular post (Русская народная почта) (stageplay)
         – Aleksandr Goldstein, Farewell to Narciss (Прощание с нарциссом) (literary critics)
 1998 – Andrei Volos, Hurramabad (Хуррамабад) (novel)
         – Maksim Amelin, cycle of poetry Follow Sumarokov with olive of victory (За Сумароковым с победною оливой)   (poetry)
         – Maksim Kurochkin, Ironwill (Стальова воля) (stageplay)
         – Oleg Davydov, Demon of Solzhenitsyn (Демон Солженицына) (literary critics)
         – Emma Gerstein, Moscow Memoirs (Мемуары)
         – Marina Tarkovski, Shards of mirror (Осколки зеркала) (Memoirs)
 1999 – no prose was awarded
         – no poetry was awarded; prize was kept and later awarded Boris Ryzhy, From Sverdlovsk with love
         – Evgeni Grishkovets, Notes of Russian voyager and Winter (Записки русского путешественника, Зима) (stageplays)
         – Pavel Basinski,  (literary critics)
         – Aleksandr Ivanchenko, Bathing of red horse (poem without heroes),  (Купание Красного коня (поэма без героев))
 2000 – Boris Akunin Coronation, or the Last of the Romanovs (Коронация, или Последний из РОМАНОВ) (novel)
         – Bajyt Kenzheiev, Girl from the morning dream (Снящаяся под утро) (poetry)
         – Vasili Sigarev, Plasticine (Пластилин) (stageplay)
         – Evgeni Yermolin, (literary critics)
         – Aleksei Filippov , Diary of desperation and hope (Дневник отчаяния и надежды'')

External links
History of the prize (in Russian)
Article in Britannica

Russian literary awards
Russian-language literary awards
Awards established in 1995
1995 establishments in Russia
Awards disestablished in 2001
2001 disestablishments in Russia